The office of Deputy Prime Minister of Lebanon was formed in 1943. The National Pact stipulates that the Deputy Prime Minister should always be Greek Orthodox Christian.

List

See also 

 Government of Lebanon

References 

 
Government ministers of Lebanon
1943 establishments in Lebanon